Steven Gary Hampshire (born 17 October 1979) is a Scottish former professional footballer. During his career, Hampshire played for Chelsea, Dunfermline Athletic, Brechin City, Stenhousemuir and Berwick Rangers.

Career
Hampshire was born in Edinburgh, Scotland. He began his career as a youth player at English club Chelsea. He made just one appearance for the club, coming on as a substitute in a 1–1 draw (Chelsea won on penalties) with Blackburn Rovers in the League Cup in October 1997. He was released in 2000 and joined Dunfermline Athletic, having previously had a loan spell at the Fife club. He remained at Dunfermline for three years, but failed to establish a regular place in the first team and was released in 2003. He was quickly signed by Brechin City where he remained for a further four years. He was voted Second Division Player of the Year 2004–05 season Brechin were also Second Division Champions that season. He also won player of the month January 2005.

He left Brechin City in May 2007 and joined Stenhousemuir.

Personal life
His younger brother Paul also played professional football.

References

External links

 (Berwick Rangers)

Living people
1979 births
Footballers from Edinburgh
Association football forwards
Scottish footballers
Scottish Premier League players
Scottish Football League players
Chelsea F.C. players
Dunfermline Athletic F.C. players
Brechin City F.C. players
Stenhousemuir F.C. players
Berwick Rangers F.C. players